The 1974 Yukon general election was held on 7 October 1974 to elect the twelve members of the 23rd Yukon Territorial Council. The council consisted of 10 non-partisan and two members elected for the Yukon NDP. It had merely an advisory role to the federally appointed Commissioner for some departments, but had full responsibility for several departments through the appointment of three councillors to an executive committee.

This was the last election in the territory to the legislative council; beginning with the 1978 election, all subsequent elections in the territory have been to the expanded Yukon Legislative Assembly.

There were 38 candidates. Out of a potential 9,542 electors, 6,145 people cast ballots for a voter turnout of 64.4 per cent.

Results

References
 

Elections in Yukon
1974 elections in Canada
1974 in Yukon
October 1974 events in Canada